The Arajs Kommando (also: Sonderkommando Arajs), led by SS commander and Nazi collaborator Viktors Arājs, was a unit of Latvian Auxiliary Police subordinated to the German Sicherheitsdienst (SD). It was a notorious killing unit during the Holocaust.

Formation
After the entry of the Einsatzkommando into the Latvian capital contact between Viktors Arājs and Brigadeführer Walter Stahlecker was established on 1 July 1941. Stahlecker instructed Arājs to set up a commando group that obtained the official name Latvian Auxiliary Security Police or Arajs Kommando. The unit was composed of students and former officers of far-right wing orientation. All of the Arajs Kommando members were volunteers, and free to leave at any time. The following day on 2 July, Stahlecker revealed to Arājs that his commando group had to unleash against the Jews a pogrom that looked spontaneous.

Activities
The Arajs Kommando unit actively participated in a variety of Nazi atrocities, including the killing of Jews, Roma, and mental patients, as well as punitive actions and massacres of civilians along Latvia's eastern border with the Soviet Union. The Kommando is estimated to have killed around 26,000 of Latvia's Jews. Most notably, the unit took part in the mass execution of Jews in the Liepāja massacres. They also participated in the mass slaughter of Jews from the Riga Ghetto and several thousand Jews deported from Germany, as guards at the Rumbula massacre of November 30 and December 8, 1941.  Some of the commando's men also served as guards at the Salaspils concentration camp.

As can be seen in contemporary Nazi newsreels, part of a documentation campaign to create the image that the Holocaust in the Baltics was a local, and not Nazi-directed activity, the Arajs Kommando figured prominently in the burning of Riga's Great (Choral) Synagogue on 4 July 1941. Commemoration of this event has been chosen for marking Holocaust Memorial Day in present-day Latvia.

The unit numbered about 300–500 men during the period that it participated in killings of the Latvian Jewish population, and reached up to 1,500 members at its peak at the height of its involvement in anti-partisan operations in 1942. In the final phases of the war, the unit was disbanded, and its personnel transferred to the Latvian Legion.

Prosecution

A total of 356 Arajs Kommando have been identified. Between 1944 and 1966, 352 of them were prosecuted by the Soviets, albeit one case was later suspended.

Fourteen of the death sentences were never carried out since the Soviets temporarily abolished capital punishment between 1947 and 1949, thus saving the lives of the condemned convicts and more who went on trial during this period. The most frequently imposed sentence was 25 years in prison, with hard labor, plus forfeiture of civil rights for 5 years, plus forfeiture of all property. After the fall of the Soviet Union, Latvian courts rehabilitated more than 40 of those convicted despite overwhelming evidence in virtually all of the cases.

After successfully hiding in West Germany for several decades after the war under an assumed name, Viktors Arājs was eventually identified by a former colleague, arrested, tried, and imprisoned for his crimes.

Herberts Cukurs, a deputy commander of the Arajs Kommado, was assassinated by the Israeli Mossad in 1965. While living in Brazil, Cukurs was befriended by a German-speaking Mossad agent, who lured him to Uruguay, where Cukurs was ambushed.

More recently, the governments of Canada, the United States, the United Kingdom, and Australia were involved in the attempt to extradite Konrāds Kalējs, a former officer of the Arajs Kommando, to Latvia for trial on charges of genocide. Kalējs died in 2001 in Australia before the extradition could proceed, maintaining his innocence to the end, stating that he was fighting Russia on the Eastern Front or studying at university when the slaughter of Jews took place in 1941. Historian of the Latvian Holocaust Andrew Ezergailis estimated that about a third of the Arājs Kommando, 500 out of a maximum of around 1,500 total members, actively participated in the killings of Jews, and claimed that one cannot be convicted of crimes against humanity based solely on membership in an organization.

References

Further reading 
 
 
 Foreign Ministry of Latvia: The Holocaust in German-Occupied Latvia

Nazi SS
Latvian collaborators with Nazi Germany
The Holocaust in Latvia
Local participation in the Holocaust
Einsatzgruppen
Generalbezirk Lettland